KRI Raden Eddy Martadinata (331) is the lead ship of the s of the Indonesian Navy.

Design and description  
The R.E. Martadinata class of guided-missile frigates of the Indonesian Navy are SIGMA 10514 types of the Netherlands-designed Sigma family of modular naval vessels, the frigates are each built from six modules or sections, four built at the PT PAL shipyard at Surabaya, while the other two, consisted of the power plant and the bridge and command centre modules, at Damen Schelde Naval Shipbuilding in the Netherlands.

The ship is powered by combined diesel or electric (CODOE) propulsion, consisted of two  MCR diesel engines and two  MCR electric motors connected to two shafts with controllable-pitch propellers. The frigate has complement of 122 personnel.

She is armed with one OTO Melara 76 mm gun, one 35 mm Rheinmetall Oerlikon Millennium Gun close-in weapon system, and two 20 mm Denel GI-2 autocannons. For surface warfare, Raden Eddy Martadinata are equipped with eight Exocet MM40 Block III anti-ship missiles, and twelve vertical launching system cell for MBDA MICA anti-aircraft missiles. For anti-submarine warfare, she is equipped with two triple 324 mm EuroTorp B515 torpedo tubes for A244/S Mod.3 Whitehead torpedoes.

Her electronic system and sensors consisted of Thales Group TACTICOS combat management system with ten Multifunction Operator Consoles (MOC) Mk.4, SMART-S Mk 2 3D multibeam surveillance radar integrated with Thales TSB 2520 IFF system, Sperry Marine BridgeMasterE ARPA navigation radar, STIR 1.2 MK.2 (STING) electro-optical fire control system, LINK Y Mk 2 datalink system, Thales UMS 4132 Kingklip medium frequency active/passive hull-mounted sonar, CAPTAS 2/UMS 4229 variable depth sonar, Thales VIGILE 100 ESM, Thales Scorpion ECM, and TERMA SKWS DLT-12T 130mm decoy launchers located in port and starboard.

Raden Eddy Martadinata also has a hangar and flight deck at stern and could accommodate one <10 tons helicopter. The ship is usually assigned with an Eurocopter AS565 Panther helicopter. The frigate also carries two rigid-hull inflatable boats.

Construction and career 
The frigate construction was started with the first steel cutting ceremony on 15 January 2014 at PAL Indonesia shipyard in Surabaya, attended by then Minister of Defense Purnomo Yusgiantoro. On the same day, another first steel cutting ceremony was done at Damen Schelde Naval Shipbuilding facility in Vlissingen to start the construction of two Dutch-built modules. Her keel was laid down on 16 April 2014 at the PAL Indonesia shipyard, which also assembled the ship's six modules. The ship was launched on 18 January 2016. She completed her sea trials on 7 September 2016 and was delivered to the Ministry of Defense of Indonesia on 23 January 2017. Raden Eddy Martadinata was officially commissioned on 7 April 2017 by the Minister of Defense Ryamizard Ryacudu at Pondok Dayung naval base in Tanjung Priok, North Jakarta.

She participated in the 2018 RIMPAC.

The ship entered PAL Indonesia drydock in Surabaya at around July–August 2018 for FFBNW (Fit For But Not With) refit project, which consisted of four work stages and lasted 17 months. The refit project included the installation of electronic warfare suites and the Rheinmetall Oerlikon Millennium Gun close-in weapon system. The refit was finished on 4 December 2019.

References

External links 

Sea Trials of first SIGMA 10514 PKR frigate for Indonesian navy by Damen on YouTube

2016 ships
Martadinata-class frigates
Ships built in Vlissingen